Jordan Stewart (born 31 March 1995) is a Northern Irish professional footballer who plays for NIFL Premiership side Glenavon, on loan from Linfield. He has also been called up for the Northern Ireland U21s. Stewart can play as both a midfielder and as a centre forward.

Club career

Glentoran
Stewart started his football career as a junior playing for Linfield, Crusaders and Windsor Youth before joining Glentoran.

During the 2014–2015 season, Stewart made 36 appearances for Glentoran and scored 13 goals, with his most notable game being a hat-trick against Warrenpoint. In July 2015, Stewart signed a contract which would keep him at Glentoran until 2018. On 14 July 2015, he was suspended for two weeks for breaching his contract by playing for another team on 11 July.

Stewart's final goals during his spell with Glentoran came in the 2–2 home draw against reigning champions Crusaders. His first goal of the game was a 30-yard strike which gained much media attention across the United Kingdom.

Swindon Town
During his career at Glentoran, Stewart gained the attention of Premier League and Football League clubs in England including Stoke City, Crystal Palace and Middlesbrough. However, on 21 August 2015 and several days after an unofficial announcement, Glentoran confirmed Stewart would move to Swindon Town in an undisclosed deal was believed to be between £50,000 to £55,000. Stewart's contract was reported to be for two years with a plus one option. Only 6 weeks into his time at Swindon he made it clear to club chairman Lee Power that he was homesick and did not want to continue to play for Swindon Town and that wanted to return to Northern Ireland. Glentoran showed interest in buying him back, and were also attempting to loan him back until the end of the 2015–2016 season until the deal fell through. This was because of Swindon's instance that a clause be included to allow a 24-hour recall to happen. This, although practised in England, is against FIFA regulations which only permit loan players to move in transfer windows. The Irish Football Association would therefore have correctly blocked the players registration.

On 24 March 2016, Stewart joined National League side Grimsby Town on loan until the end of the season. Having made two appearances in his loan spell, on 22 April 2016, Stewart has returned to parent club Swindon Town.

He scored his first goal for the club against Queens Park Rangers in an EFL Cup match on 10 August 2016. He also scored in the penalty shoot-out, however Swindon Town lost 4–2 in penalties.

On 2 May 2017, it was announced that Stewart would leave Swindon upon the expiry of his contract in June 2017.

Linfield
Preceding his release from Swindon, on 8 May 2017, Stewart returned to Northern Ireland to join boyhood club Linfield. On 28 June 2017, Stewart scored on his Linfield debut in their UEFA Champions League qualifier against La Fiorita, netting the winner in their 1–0 victory in the 89th minute.

Glenavon
On 31 January 2023, it was announced that Stewart had signed on loan with Glenavon until the end of the season.

International career
Stewart has represented Northern Ireland national football team at Under-19 level, making his debut in the 1–1 draw against France. In August 2015, Stewart was called up to the Under-21 set-up by coach Jim Magilton for their fixtures against Scotland and Iceland.

Personal life
Stewart attended Belfast Met. His grandfather, Phil Scott, was also a footballer.

Career statistics

Honours

Club
Glentoran
 Irish Cup (1): 2014–15
 NIFL Charity Shield (1): 2015–16

References

External links

1995 births
Living people
Glentoran F.C. players
Swindon Town F.C. players
Grimsby Town F.C. players
Linfield F.C. players
NIFL Premiership players
Association footballers from Northern Ireland
Association footballers from Belfast
Association football midfielders